Vecindad (Spanish, 'neighborhood'; concept of householder, citizenship) is a deeply-rooted Hispanic concept. In Iberia during the Reconquista from Muslim rule, new towns were founded and to entice settlers, they were offered the status of vecinos, prominent and respected residents and citizens. In colonial Mexico in the immediate conquest era, only encomenderos, those holding grants of the labor and tribute of particular Indian communities, were granted the title of vecino.  As Spanish cities were founded in New Spain, vecinos could petition the municipal council cabildo for a grant of land in the municipality to build a house and land outside the municipality to pursue economic activity.  As the number of Spanish households increased, the term vecino expanded to mean male head of household and neighbor, and came to mean being a member of Spanish colonial society.

The word vecindad can also refer to a person's legal residence, in terms of a city, province, or state, not just a neighborhood. In Guatemala, there's a national ID referred to as carnet de vecindad, not mattering the actual "neighborhood" but giving the person a legal document saying they are from that country. In parts of for a building containing several (often low-income oriented) housing units. It was originally a form of housing created from a residential subdivision of vacated elite housing in historic centers in Mexican cities, where rooms around a central patio were let to families who shared facilities (such as lavatories and/or kitchens) with the other tenants. Purpose-built vecindades were constructed in the early 20th century to meet the demand for central low-income housing and resembled the original vecindades by having small units and shared facilities. The term is now used ambiguously.

In some Latin American countries the "vecindades" are called "conventillos". The word is a derogative from "convento": cloister. The name comes from the similarity of the spatial distribution of the buildings: covered living spaces around an open court or "patio".
Important is the inherent social tissue of the "vecindad/conventillo". The dwellers form a complex communal unit with a varied array of social interrelationships. The outside world, very often, considers the inhabitants of a "vecindad" as a group of slum people and project on them their prejudices against the lower classes.

In the modern era, the idea of vecindad is debated in the European Union.

References

Further reading
Amunátegui Perelló, Carlos Felipe . "Las relaciones de vecindad y la teoría de las inmisiones en el Código Civil." Revista de Derecho (Valparaiso) XXXVIII (2012): 77-120.
Beltrán, Clara López. "La buena vecindad: las mujeres de elite en la sociedad colonial del siglo XVII." Colonial Latin American Review 5.2 (1996): 219-236.
Esquivel Hernández, María Teresa. "El uso cotidiano de los espacios habitacionales: de la vecindad a la vivienda de interés social en la ciudad de México." Scripta Nova: revista electrónica de geografía y ciencias sociales 7 (2003).
Herzog, Tamar. "La vecindad: entre condición formal y negociación continua. Reflexiones en torno de las categorías sociales y las redes personales." Anuario IEHS: Instituto de Estudios histórico sociales 15 (2000): 123-131.
Llorente, Mercedes Guinea. "La Política Europea de Vecindad y la estabilización del entorno próximo: el caso de Europa Oriental." Revista de Derecho Comunitario Europeo 12.31 (2008): 805-831.
Mendoza, Edwin Monsalvo. "Ciudadanía, vecindad y sufragio en Cartagena 1810-1834." Historia y Memoria 6 (2013): 171-204.
Rodríguez-Cano, Rodrigo Bercovitz. "Vecindad civil y nacional." Anuario de derecho civil 36.4 (1983): 1149-1168.

History of Mexico
Architecture in Mexico